Cahiers intempestifs is a French publishing house of books on the visual arts, including contemporary art and graphic arts.

History 
It was founded in 1993 by Rémi Guichard and Véronique Gay-Rosier. Since the beginning Véronique Gay-Rosier has been editor and art director.
The publishing director was Jacques Claude from 2006 to 2015 and has been Jean-Christophe Aussel since 2015.

Collections 
Its main publications are :

• A bi-annual contemporary art magazine, called Cahiers intempestifs.

• A collection of graphic art books.

• A collection of design objects.

Cahiers intempestifs is also well known for its experimentation with multimedia, augmented reality, social networking…

Authors and Artists published 
Txomin Badiola, Jean-Christophe Bailly, Miquel Barceló, Jacquie Barral, Lionel Bayol-Thémines, Jean-Pierre Bertrand, Jean-Sylvain Bieth, Jean-Noël Blanc, Stéphane Bouquet, Lionel Bourg, Yves Bresson, Pierre Buraglio, Michel Butor, Sophie Calle, Georges-Olivier Châteaureynaud, Noëlle Châtelet, Éric Chevillard, Robert Combas, Patrick Corillon, Marie Denis, Erik Dietman, Jimmie Durham, CharlElie, Tessa Farmer, Philippe Favier, Federico Ferrari, Ian Hamilton Finlay, Paul Fournel, Christian Garcin, Ludger Gerdes, Jochen Gerz, Paul-Armand Gette, Peter Greenaway, Raphaëlle de Groot, Marie-Ange Guilleminot, Susan Hiller, Éric Holder, Fabrice Hybert, Wang Jiuliang, Jacques Jouet, Isaac Julien, Sharon Kivland, Anne Lacaton, Philippe Lacoue-Labarthe, Jean Le Gac, Sol LeWitt, Tomás Maia, François Martin, Jean-François Manier, Keiichi Matsuda, Julian Maynard Smith & Station House Opera, Abdelwahab Meddeb, Charles Melman, Daniel Mesguich, Christian Milovanoff, Mihael Milunovic, Robert Morris, Jean-Luc Nancy, Roman Opalka, Jean-Michel Othoniel, Patrick Othoniel, Bernard Pagès, Riccardo Panattoni, Claudio Parmiggiani, Anne et Patrick Poirier, Richard Price, Wu Qi, Bernard Rancillac, Sophie Ristelhueber, Jacques Roubaud, Sonia Rykiel, Sarkis, Saschienne, Gianluca Solla, Ettore Spalletti, Swoon, Agnès Thurnauer, David Tremlett, Nils-Udo, Claude Viallat, Bernar Venet, Dai Xiang.

References 
- Distinguished by Stratégies for the bOx of Life : Grand Prix Stratégies de la Production Publicitaire 2016.

- Selected to participate in the exhibition "Design map, designers créateurs de valeurs pour l’entreprise", June 2014 - January 2015.

- Distinguished by Cities Of DEsign/UNESCO, November 2013.

- Light #10, "Nuit blanche", Paris, October 2013, CNEAI.

- Caractère, April 2013, # 696, "Bonnes feuilles : Des hommes de caractères, éditions des Cahiers intempestifs".

- Tank, April 2013, "l'art du papier : la Paper Toy Box et le Gunnies'project, éditions des Cahiers intempestifs".

- The Paris Book Fair.

- Les points sous les i, "Hermitage selon Chave, les Cahiers intempestifs", January 2013.

- "Caractères, fontes et casses", Le monde diplomatique # 705 December 2012.

- "Les (très beaux) Cahiers Intempestifs", The Glam Attitude, November 2012.

- L’Art de la pause, "Lieux de pause du livre : Cahiers intempestifs", Jacquie Barral, Publication de l'université de Saint-Étienne, November 2012.

- Des maisons d'éditions en Rhône-Alpes, ARALD.

- "Les Cahiers intempestifs # 25, So british", Livre et lire, # 255, October 2010.

- "Cahiers intempestifs", Le monde diplomatique, June 2010.

- Le dessin et le livre, "L’échappée belle des Cahiers intempestifs", Valentine Oncins; "Un jeu de mots proposés par Valentine Oncins à Véronique Gay-Rosier", Publication de l'université de Saint-Étienne, November 2009.

- "Le papier prépare ses stratégies de défense", France graphique, September 2009.

- 363 000 signes, Cahiers Intempestifs, reward Nuit du Livre.

- "Les 100 qui font bouger Saint-Étienne : littérature édition, Véronique Gay-Rosier et les Cahiers intempestifs", L'express # 2598, April 2001.

- "Éditions des Cahiers intempestifs, à contretemps", Livre et lire, # 164, mai 2001.

- "Cahiers intempestifs", Beaux arts magazine, October 1997.

- "Cahiers intempestifs", Livres de France # 180, December 1995.

- "Cahiers intempestifs : la voix politique", Libération.

- "10 ans de Cahiers Intempestifs", Plumart.

- "Cahiers intempestifs 4", Art Press, November 1995.

External links 
 Official website
 Le Monde diplomatique
 Le Monde diplomatique
 Libération

Book publishing companies of France
Visual arts publishing companies